Shahrak-e Sadat (also Romanized as Shahrak-e Sādāt; also known as Sādāt and Sharafeh) is a village in Dasht-e Abbas Rural District, Musian District, Dehloran County, Ilam Province, Iran. At the 2006 census, its population was 232, in 31 families.

References 

Populated places in Dehloran County